The Cathedral of the Assumption of Our Lady of Segorbe is  a Roman Catholic church in Segorbe, province of Castellón, Spain. It is the see of the Diocese of Segorbe-Castellon. It was elevated to the rank of minor basilica in 1985.

History

Located against the city's walls, the church, once a mosque, has been completely rebuilt in 1246 in Valencian Gothic style in such a manner that it preserves no trace of Arab architecture.  Of this 13th-century edifice, only parts of the western façade, the vaults of several chapels, the load-bearing walls, the tower of Santa Barbara, the bell tower  and the cloister remain. It was consecrated on 7 May 1534, and has a single, cross-vaulted nave, without  transept and dome, with chapels located between the buttresses.  It is connected by a bridge with the old episcopal palace.

The bell tower, with a massive appearance and a square plan, is typically Romanesque in his simplicity. The Gothic cloister has a trapezoidal plan and two floors: the lower one dates to the 14th-15th centuries, while the other was added in the late 15th and early 16th centuries. The main façade dates to 1665.

The presbytery was renewed in Renaissance style during the 16th century; the high altar was also added in 1530, under design by Vicente Juan Masip. The church is decorated by frescoes of Luis Planes.

The church was renovated in 1791-1795 in Neo-classic style, resulting in the nearly total hiding of the Gothic structure. The nave was lengthened, and new altars were added.

Museum
The Cathedral museum houses several artworks by local and foreign artists, belonging to the International Gothic, the 15th-century Flemish painting, the 16th-century Valencian school and more recent ones. Artists represented include Jaume Mateu (St. Jerome Altarpiece, c. 1450),  Vicente Juan Masip and his son Juan (two 16th-century altarpieces), as well as the Italian Donatello, with an attributed work.

Notes

References

External links

Official website 

Buildings and structures in the Province of Castellón
13th-century Roman Catholic church buildings in Spain
Segorbe
Gothic architecture in the Valencian Community
Churches in the Valencian Community
Bien de Interés Cultural landmarks in the Province of Castellón
Churches completed in 1246
Segorbe